Elections to Armagh District Council were held on 30 May 1973 on the same day as the other Northern Irish local government elections. The election used four district electoral areas to elect a total of 20 councillors.

Election results

Districts summary

|- class="unsortable" align="centre"
!rowspan=2 align="left"|Ward
! % 
!Cllrs
! % 
!Cllrs
! %
!Cllrs
! %
!Cllrs
! % 
!Cllrs
!rowspan=2|TotalCllrs
|- class="unsortable" align="center"
!colspan=2 bgcolor="" | UUP
!colspan=2 bgcolor="" | SDLP
!colspan=2 bgcolor="" | DUP
!colspan=2 bgcolor="" | Alliance
!colspan=2 bgcolor="white"| Others
|-
|align="left"|Area A
|bgcolor="40BFF5"|34.3
|bgcolor="40BFF5"|2
|14.6
|0
|24.8
|1
|5.3
|0
|21.0
|1
|4
|-
|align="left"|Area B
|bgcolor="40BFF5"|53.6
|bgcolor="40BFF5"|4
|14.4
|1
|20.5
|1
|9.1
|0
|2.4
|0
|6
|-
|align="left"|Area C
|bgcolor="40BFF5"|44.1
|bgcolor="40BFF5"|2
|34.8
|2
|0.0
|0
|7.0
|1
|14.1
|0
|5
|-
|align="left"|Area D
|bgcolor="40BFF5"|44.4
|bgcolor="40BFF5"|3
|28.0
|2
|0.0
|0
|8.7
|0
|18.9
|0
|5
|- class="unsortable" class="sortbottom" style="background:#C9C9C9"
|align="left"| Total
|45.4
|11
|22.7
|5
|11.3
|2
|7.8
|1
|12.8
|1
|20
|-
|}

Districts results

Area A

1973: 2 x UUP, 1 x DUP, 1 x Independent

Area B

1973: 4 x UUP, 1 x DUP, 1 x SDLP

Area C

1973: 2 x SDLP, 2 x UUP, 1 x Alliance

Area D

1973: 3 x UUP, 2 x SDLP

References

Armagh City and District Council elections
Armagh